The 1897–98 Butler Christians men's basketball team represented Butler University during the 1897–98 college men's basketball season. The head coach was James Zink, coaching in his first season with the Bulldogs.

Schedule

|-

References

Butler Bulldogs men's basketball seasons
Butler
Butl
Butl